Boisset may refer to several communes in France:

Boisset, Cantal
Boisset, Hérault
Boisset, Haute-Loire
Boisset, a village part of the commune of Sainte-Enimie, in the Lozère département
Boisset-et-Gaujac, in the Gard département 
Boisset-lès-Montrond, in the Loire département
Boisset-les-Prévanches, in the Eure département 
Boisset-Saint-Priest, in the Loire département 
Boissets, in the Yvelines département 
Boissets, in the Eure département

See also
Boisset (surname)
Boisset Collection
Jean-Charles Boisset
Boissey (disambiguation)